Middleton Park is a ward in the metropolitan borough of the City of Leeds, West Yorkshire, England.  It contains 13 listed buildings that are recorded in the National Heritage List for England.  All the listed buildings are designated at Grade II, the lowest of the three grades, which is applied to "buildings of national importance and special interest".  The ward contains suburbs to the south of the centre of Leeds, including the former village of Middleton and Belle Isle.  The listed buildings consist of a house and associated outbuildings, a row of cottages, a church and associated structures, buildings in Hunslet Cemetery, and a group of almshouses and associated structures.


Buildings

References

Citations

Sources

 

Lists of listed buildings in West Yorkshire